Raja Chandra Vijay Singh (born 18 December 1950) is an Indian politician and Raja of Sahaspur.

Early life and education 
Raja Chandra Vijay Singh Urf (Baby Raja) was born  in Lucknow, Uttar Pradesh. He was educated at The Doon School in Dehradun, and thereafter studied law (LL.B.) at the Faculty of Law, University of Delhi.

Political career 
He has been a Member of the Uttar Pradesh Legislative Assembly (two terms) 1989/1991 and 1993/1995) and has also been a Member of Parliament for the Bharatiya Janata Party, representing Moradabad (13th Lok Sabha – 1999/2004). In 2004 he was defeated for reelection by Shafiqurrahman Barq.

References 

1950 births
Living people
The Doon School alumni
Delhi University alumni
Politicians from Lucknow
Uttar Pradesh MLAs 1989–1991
Uttar Pradesh MLAs 1993–1996
India MPs 1999–2004
People from Moradabad district
Bharatiya Janata Party politicians from Uttar Pradesh
Janata Dal politicians